Cor Bakker (born 19 August 1961) is a Dutch pianist.

Bakker was born at Landsmeer.  He rose to fame playing in De Schreeuw van De Leeuw, a television show starring Paul de Leeuw
He has had his own Radio Show called Music Minded, which he continued on television titled Cor & Co from 1996 until 2001. He also hosted Cor op Reis, a travel documentary series.

It was announced in July 2018 that he would participate on the trivia gameshow The Smartest Person.

References

External links
Official website

1961 births
Living people
People from Landsmeer
Dutch pianists
21st-century pianists